The following is a list of FCC-licensed radio stations in the U.S. state of Nevada, which can be sorted by their call signs, frequencies, cities of license, licensees, and programming formats.

List of radio stations

Defunct
 KLME

References

 
Nevada